Cercospora cannabis is a fungal plant pathogen.

References

cannabis
Fungal plant pathogens and diseases
Hemp diseases